Vienna, City of Song (German:Wien, du Stadt der Lieder) is a 1923 Austrian silent film directed by Alfred Deutsch-German and starring Franz Glawatsch, Max Ralph-Ostermann and Louis Böhm. A later sound film was also made with the same title directed by Richard Oswald.

Cast
 Franz Glawatsch   
 Max Ralph-Ostermann  
 Louis Böhm  
 Alice Hechy 
 Fritz Wrede   
 Louis Seeman   
 Anita Berber   
 Lina Frank   
 Loni Lechner

References

Bibliography
 Holmes, Deborah & Silverman, Lisa. Interwar Vienna: Culture Between Tradition and Modernity. Camden House, 2009.

External links

1923 films
Austrian silent feature films
Films directed by Alfred Deutsch-German
Films set in Vienna
Austrian black-and-white films